Chodiala railway station is a railway station in Saharanpur district, Uttar Pradesh. Its code is CDL. It serves Chodiala city. The station consists of two platforms. The platforms are not well sheltered. It lacks many facilities including water and sanitation. The station is located 14 km from Roorkee and 21 km from Saharanpur.

Major trains 
 Saharanpur–Moradabad Passenger (unreserved)
 Haridwar–Delhi Passenger (unreserved)
 Saharanpur–Lucknow Passenger
 Rishikesh–Old Delhi Passenger (unreserved)
 Dehradun–Saharanpur Passenger (unreserved)

References

Railway stations in Saharanpur district
Moradabad railway division